The West Virginia Department of Education is the state education agency of West Virginia. It is headquartered in Charleston.

History

The original West Virginia Constitution of 1863 established a system of free public schools. This was when the State attempted to introduce the township system in West Virginia, and each township was to be divided into sub-districts, the level where school affairs would be handled. The West Virginia Constitution of 1872 dismantled the township system, though the State would remain divided into 398 school districts until the County Unit Plan was approved in 1933, which organized schools at the county level.

The West Virginia Board of Education was established in 1908. At that time, the Board's members were appointed by the Superintendent, which was an elected position. In 1958, a constitutional amendment made the Board a constitutional body, and changed the office of Superintendent from an elected to an appointed position.

Board of Education

Currently, the West Virginia Board of Education is made up of nine citizens appointed by the Governor, who serve nine year terms, and three non-voting ex officio members, the State Superintendent of Schools, the Chancellor of the West Virginia Higher Education Policy Commission, and the Chancellor of Community and Technical College Education.

The Board has the power to establish policies and rules over the State's public schools that carry into effect legislation passed regarding public education, as well as general supervision of the West Virginia Schools for the Deaf and Blind.

The Current members of the West Virginia Board of Education are as follows:
Miller L. Hall, President
Thomas W. Campbell, Vice President
F. Scott Rotruck, Financial Officer
Robert W. Dunlevy
A. Stanley Maynard
Daniel D. Snavely
Debra K. Sullivan
Nancy J. White
James S. Wilson

Ex Officio Members
W. Clayton Burch, State Superintendent of Schools
Sarah Armstrong Tucker, Chancellor of Community and Technical College Education, interim Chancellor of the West Virginia Higher Education Policy Commission

References

External links
 
 WVDE Facebook Page
 WVDE Twitter Page

Public education in West Virginia
State departments of education of the United States
State agencies of West Virginia
1863 establishments in West Virginia